The 2009–10 Welsh Football League Division Two began on 15 August 2009 and ended on 22 May 2010. Penrhiwceiber Rangers won the league by two points.

Team changes from 2008–09
West End, Ely Rangers and Garden Village were promoted to the Welsh Football League Division One.

Cwmbran Town, Croesyceiliog and Newport YMCA were relegated from the Welsh Football League Division One.

Pentwyn Dynamos, Garw and Pontypridd Town were relegated to the Welsh Football League Division Three.

AFC Llwydcoed, AFC Porth and Porthcawl Town were promoted from the Welsh Football League Division Three.

League table

Results

External links
 Welsh Football League

Welsh Football League Division Two seasons
3